Heterocyphelium is a lichen genus in the family Lecanographaceae. It was circumscribed by Finnish lichenologist Edvard August Vainio in 1927, with H. leucampyx assigned as the type species. The genus remained monotypic until a new species, H. triseptatum, was described in 2017 from collections made in Brazil.

References

Arthoniomycetes
Arthoniomycetes genera
Taxa described in 1927
Taxa named by Edvard August Vainio